Sergio Félix Galilea Ocón (born 20 May 1948) is a Chilean politician and engineer who served as minister of State.

In 2017, he was appointed by Michelle Bachelet as the reconstruction manager after the 2017 wildfires in cities like Santa Olga.

References

External links
 Profile at University of Chile's INAP

1948 births
Living people
University of Chile alumni
Pontifical Catholic University of Chile alumni
20th-century Chilean politicians
21st-century Chilean politicians
Christian Democratic Party (Chile) politicians
Popular Unitary Action Movement politicians
Party for Democracy (Chile) politicians